Fancy You may refer to:

 Fancy You (EP), by Twice, 2019
 "Fancy You", a 2005 song by Wet Dog
 "I Fancy You", a song by Crush from his 2014 EP Crush on You